Andrés Kogovsek (born 7 January 1974) is an Argentine handball player. He was born in San Isidro, Argentina, and plays for the club Villa Ballester. He defended Argentina at the 2012 London Summer Olympics, and was a gold medalist at the 2011 Pan American Games.

Achievements
Argentine League
2015, 2017

Individual awards
2017 Pan American Men's Club Handball Championship: Best right wing

References

External links

1974 births
Living people
Argentine people of Slovenian descent
Argentine male handball players
Olympic handball players of Argentina
Handball players at the 2012 Summer Olympics
People from San Isidro, Buenos Aires
Sportspeople from Buenos Aires Province
Pan American Games medalists in handball
Pan American Games gold medalists for Argentina
Pan American Games silver medalists for Argentina
Handball players at the 2003 Pan American Games
Handball players at the 2011 Pan American Games
Medalists at the 2011 Pan American Games